Taekwondo at the 2021 Summer Deaflympics  was held in Caxias Do Sul, Brazil from 6 to 8 May 2022.

Medal summary

Medalists

Kyorugi

Men

Women

Poomsae

References

External links
 Deaflympics 2021

2021 Summer Deaflympics
2022 in taekwondo
Taekwondo competitions in Brazil